Sēlpils is a village in Sala Municipality, Latvia.

Sēlpils may also refer to:

Sēlpils Parish, Latvia
A former name of Vecsēlpils ("old Sēlpils"), a village in Latvia
Sēlpils Castle,  an ancient  castle, Latvia 
Sēlpils (city), a mediaeval city by the castle